is a Japanese visual artist, character designer, illustrator, a scenic designer for theatre and film, and a costume designer. He first came into prominence in the late 1960s working on the anime adaptation of Speed Racer. Amano later became the creator of iconic and influential characters such as Gatchaman, Tekkaman, Honeybee Hutch, and Casshern. In 1982 he went independent and became a freelance artist, finding success as an illustrator for numerous authors, and worked on best-selling novel series, such as The Guin Saga and Vampire Hunter D. He is also known for his commissioned illustrations for the popular video game franchise Final Fantasy.

Since the 1990s Amano has been creating and exhibiting paintings featuring his iconic retro pop icons in galleries around the world, primarily painting on aluminium box panels with acrylic and automotive paint. He is a 5-time winner of the Seiun Award, and also won the 1999 Bram Stoker Award for his collaboration with Neil Gaiman, Sandman: The Dream Hunters.

Amano's influences include early Western comic books, Orientalism, art nouveau, and Japanese woodblock prints. In early 2010, he established Studio Devaloka, a film production company.

Biography
Amano was born in Shizuoka, Shizuoka Prefecture, Japan to Yoshio Amano (1917–1962) and Kesano Amano (née Fujimoto). He is the youngest child of four. Amano's father was a lacquer artist, specializing in traditional Suruga lacquerware. As a young adolescent, Yoshitaka Amano was fascinated with drawing. In 1967, he began working in the animation department of Tatsunoko Productions, where he was introduced to the early Japanese anime movement. His first paid project was for the Speed Racer anime franchise. He was a character designer for anime shows such as Time Bokan, Gatchaman, Tekkaman, and Honeybee Hutch.

In the 1960s, Amano was exposed to Western art styles through comic books, which he claims among his artistic roots. He has cited Neal Adams as his favorite comic book artist, noting that he would often purchase used comics based on Adams's cover artwork, only to be disappointed that the interior artist was different. Amano was also fascinated by the art styles of psychedelic art and pop art of the West, particularly the work of American Pop artist Peter Max. In the 1970s, Amano studied the artworks of the late 19th century and early 20th century European movement of Art Nouveau, as well as the Russian orientalists (Leon Bakst, Ivan Bilibin) and the ancient Japanese hand woodblock printing work of Ukiyo-e. Amano remained at Tatsunoko Productions until 1982.

Early fantasy works
During the 1980s, Amano concentrated on illustrations for science fiction and fantasy works.  Combined with the influence of his prior experience in animation, this focus resulted in a personal style influenced by both modern surrealism and realism.

He left Tatsunoko Production and started his activities as a freelancer in 1982. He did illustration and cover page design of Kimaira series, written by Baku Yumemakura, from this year. In 1983, he illustrated the novel Demon City Shinjuku and the first in Hideyuki Kikuchi's Vampire Hunter D novel series. He also worked as a character designer on the 1985 movie adaptation of Vampire Hunter D, which was one of the first anime movies to be released outside Japan. In interviews, however, Amano has stated that he was not pleased with the final product of the movie.

His illustrations begin to be published in collections such as Maten in 1984. That year he drew the manga Amon Saga, written by Baku Yumemakura, which was later adapted into an OVA.

Video games

In 1987, Amano joined Square (now known as Square Enix) to work on a role-playing video game for the Nintendo Entertainment System: Final Fantasy. Amano produced conceptual design pieces for the game in both traditional and computer designed artwork. At this time, he also worked for another video game company, Kure Software Koubou, producing box cover illustrations as well as some character designs. This work included designs for Kure's First Queen series. Following Final Fantasy VI in 1994, he stepped down as the main character, image, and graphic designer of the series. He continued to provide promotional and character artwork for the following games and to design their title logos.

Amano became the world's highest-earning artist in 1996, earning  that year from sales of silk screens, lithographs and etchings based on his book illustrations. His work began receiving international recognition following the release of Final Fantasy VII in 1997. In 2006, Hironobu Sakaguchi, the former designer and creator of the Final Fantasy series, recruited Amano and composer Nobuo Uematsu to work on video games at Mistwalker.

Amano and Nobuo Uematsu worked together again on videogames like Fairy Fencer F at Compile Heart.

Branching out
Amano's first exhibition, called "Hiten", was held in 1989 at Yurakucho Mullion in Tokyo, Japan. In 1990, he began to work as an artist and set designer for stage theater. His first work for theater was Tamasaburo Bando's Nayotake.

Beginning in 1995 with his work at the Biennale d'Orléans in France, he received increased recognition outside Japan.  Further international exhibitions followed, including the 1999 "Hero" at the Angel Orensanz Foundation and the 1997 workshop and exhibition "Think Like Amano".

In 1998, Amano appeared as Hiroshi in the 1998 movie New Rose Hotel, loosely based on the William Gibson short story of the same name.

Freelancing
In 2000, Amano illustrated Neil Gaiman's The Sandman: The Dream Hunters, which won several awards and was nominated for a Hugo Award.  In 2001, Greg Rucka and Amano collaborated on another comic book tale, Elektra and Wolverine: The Redeemer. His character designs were used in another Vampire Hunter D movie entitled Vampire Hunter D: Bloodlust. In 2006, the first volume of his HERO series was released by Boom! Studios. He was key visual and costume designer for movies written by Baku Yumemakura, including Onmyoji, Onmyoji 2, and Taitei no Ken.

He illustrated three album covers for the Japanese power metal band Galneryus: The Flag of Punishment (2003), Advance to the Fall (2005), and Beyond the End of Despair (2006).

In 2004 Amano was asked by creative director GK Reid to create illustrations in collaboration with author Neil Gaiman and featuring David Bowie and Iman as sci-fi characters, for "The Return of the Thin White Duke" a portion of which were published in V Magazine.

In 2008, Amano created an illustrated adaptation of Wolfgang Amadeus Mozart's The Magic Flute, published by Radical Comics. He also collaborated with Christopher "mink" Morrison of Quentin Tarantino's A Band Apart production company, providing illustrations for the novel Shinjuku and Shinjuku Azul, as well as a third unannounced follow up and an online game, Shinjuku Nexus. He was the character designer for the 2009 Jungle Emperor (Kimba the White Lion) TV special, directed by Gorō Taniguchi, to commemorate both the 50th anniversary of Fuji Television and the 80th anniversary of Osamu Tezuka's birth.

Studio Devaloka
In 2010, following a small solo art exhibition tour titled "Devaloka" it was announced that Amano had established a film production company, Studio Devaloka, and would be directing a 3D anime titled Zan, with additional projects to be announced in the future. On December 15, 2010, the official website for the film, now titled Deva Zan, was unveiled, along with information concerning an upcoming press conference, to be held on December 21, 2010. The roughly ten-minute-long conference revealed details about the project, including staff, as well as a short trailer for the film, which stylistically emulates the look of Amano's paintings.

In April 2012, an illustrated novel adaptation of the work was announced by Dark Horse Manga. To be released in January 2013, the novel will be Amano's debut as an author and will include over 240 original illustrations. Despite a projected 2012 release date, Amano stated in an October 2012 interview that the animation project was still in its development and funding stages and may instead be realized as a TV series. The possibility of a video game adaptation was also mentioned.

In 2013, Amano collaborated with Japanese rock star Hyde (L'Arc-en-Ciel/VAMPS) on an art exhibition titled Destiny and Decay: Nippon Evolution.

List of works

Animation
 Science Ninja Team Gatchaman (1972)
 Casshan (1973)
 Hurricane Polymar (1974)
 New Honeybee Hutch (1974)
 Time Bokan (1975)
 Yatterman (1977)
 Zenderman (1979)
 Rescueman (1980)
 Yattodetaman (1981)
 Gyakuten! Ippatsuman (1982)
 Itadakiman (1983)
 Tekkaman: The Space Knight (1975)
 Gowappa 5 Gōdam (1976)
 Akū Daisakusen Srungle (1983)
 Genesis Climber MOSPEADA (1983)
 Radio City Fantasy
 Starzan S (1984)
 Bismark (anime) (1984)
 Angel's Egg (also co-creator of the story) (1985)
 Vampire Hunter D (1985)
 Amon Saga (1986)
 Lily C.A.T. (1987)
 1001 Nights (1998, Concert video directed by Mike Smith for music by David Newman, based on Amano's Princess Budou illustrations)
 Ayakashi (2006)
 Fantascope ~Tylostoma~(2006)
 Bird's Song (2007)
 Ten Nights of Dreams (2007)
 Vegetable Fairies: N.Y. Salad (2007)
 Jungle Emperor (2009)
 Gibiate (2020)
 Exception (2022)
 ZAN (TBA)

Novels
 A Wind Named Amnesia  English Version (2009)

Author
 DEVA ZAN (2013)

Illustrator
Select domestic Japanese works
 Vampire Hunter D (1983-ongoing)
 Guin Saga (1984–1997)
 The Heroic Legend of Arslan (1986–1999)
 Sohryuden (1987-ongoing)
 Rampo Edogawa Mystery Collection (1987–1989)
 Tekiha Kaizoku Series
 Shinsetsu Taikō-ki
 Chimera-ho Series
 Garouden
 The Tale of Genji (1997)
 Sword World RPG – Assorted artwork
 Mateki: The Magic Flute
 Illustrated Blues (2010)

Select Japanese editions of foreign works
 A Cup of Magic! (1981)
 The Prince in the Scarlet Robe, Corum (1982)
 Erekosë Saga (1983)
 Elric Saga (1984)
 Dream Weaver (1985)
 The Chronicles of Castle Brass (1988)
 Hoka Series
 Seven Brothers (2006)

Foreign works
 Sandman: The Dream Hunters (1999)
 Elektra and Wolverine: The Redeemer (2002)
 Yoshitaka Amano's HERO (2006-ongoing)
 Shinjuku (2010)
 Shinjuku Azul (TBA)

Art books
 Maten / Evil Universe (1984)
 Genmukyu / Castle of Illusions (1986)
 Imagine (1987)
 Hiten / Flying Universe: The Art of Yoshitaka Amano (1989) (
 Dawn (1991) (
 The Heroic Tales Of Arslan (1991)
 The Illustrations for Tarot Card by Yoshitaka Amano (1992) (
 Rasenoh / Spiral King (1992)
 Le Roi de la Lune (1992)
 Mono (1993)
 Untitled set of 10 postcards (1993)
 Steps To Heaven (1993)
 Yoshitaka Amano Postcard Selection (1994)
 Japan, Final Fantasy (1994)
 Katen (1994)
 Budōhime / Princess Budou (1996)
 Yousei / Fairies (1996)
 Guin Saga (1996)
 Yoshitaka Amano: Collection of Paintings (1996)
 1996 (1996)
 Kan'oke / Coffin (1997)
 Think Like Amano (1997)
 Biten (1999)
 Alice Erotica (1999)
 1001 Nights (1999)
 Märchen (2000)
 Vampire Hunter D (2000)
 POEM (2001)
 Kotatsu I (2002)
 Kotatsu II (2002)
 Guin Saga Chronicle (2002)
 The Sky (2002)
 Kiten (2002)
 Symphony (2002)
 Amano First (2003)
 The Virgin (2004)
 Yoshitaka Amano x HYDE - Destiny and Decay: Nippon Evolution (2013)
 Yoshitaka Amano Exhibition Art Book: The World Beyond Your Imagination (2015)

Video games
 Esh's Aurunmilla (1984) – Character Designer
Final Fantasy (1987) – Character Designer, Title Logo Designer and Graphic Designer
 Final Fantasy II (1988) – Character Designer, Title Logo Designer and Graphic Designer
 First Queen (1988) – Box cover artist
 Duel (1989) – Box cover artist
 Duel98 (1989) – Box cover artist
 Final Fantasy III (1990) – Character Designer & Title Logo Designer
 First Queen 2 (1990) –  Box cover artist
 Final Fantasy IV (1991) – Character Designer, Image Designer and Title Logo Designer
 Final Fantasy V (1992) – Character Designer, Image Designer and Title Logo Designer
 Kawanakajima Ibunroku (1992) – Box cover artist
 First Queen 3 (1993) – Box cover artist
 Final Fantasy VI (1994) – Character Designer, Image Designer and Title Logo Designer
 Front Mission (1995) – Character Designer
 Front Mission: Gun Hazard (1996) – Character Designer
 Final Fantasy VII (1997) – Promotional Artwork, Image Illustrator, Title Logo Designer and Character Artwork
 Kartia: The Word of Fate (1998) – Art Designer
 Final Fantasy VIII (1999) – Promotional Artwork, Image Illustrator, Title Logo Designer and Character Artwork
 Final Fantasy IX (2000) – Character Illustrations & Original Character Designer
 El Dorado Gate (2000–2001) – Creative Director & Additional Design
 Final Fantasy X (2001) – Promotional Artwork, Image Illustrations, Title Logo Designer and Character Artwork
 Final Fantasy X-2 (2003) – Promotional Artwork, Title Logo Designer and Image Illustrator
 Final Fantasy XI (2002) – Promotional Artwork, Title Logo Designer and Image Illustrator
 Final Fantasy XII (2006) – Promotional Artwork, Title Logo Designer and Image Illustrator
 Lord of Vermilion (2008) – Guest Card Illustrator
 Dissidia Final Fantasy (2008) – Title Logo Designer & Image Illustrator
 Final Fantasy IV: The After Years (2009) – Title Logo Designer
 Lord of Vermilion II (2009) – Guest Card Illustrator
 Final Fantasy XIII (2010) – Promotional Artwork, Title Logo Designer & Image Illustrator
 Final Fantasy XIV (2010) – Title Logo Designer
 Lord of Arcana (2010) – Guest Monster Designer
 Dissidia 012 Final Fantasy (2011) – Title Logo Designer & Image Illustrator
 Final Fantasy Type-0 (2011) – Promotional Artwork, Title Logo Designer & Image Illustrator
 Final Fantasy XIII-2 (2011) – Title Logo Designer
 Final Fantasy Dimensions (2012) – Title Logo Designer
 UnchainBlades EXXiV (2012) – Character Designer
 Fantasy Life (2012) – Image Illustrator
 Fairy Fencer F (2013) – Art Designer
 Child of Light (2014) – Image Illustrator
 Terra Battle (2014) – Character Design
 Final Fantasy Explorers (2014) – Title Logo Designer
 Mobius Final Fantasy (2015) – Title Logo Designer
 Final Fantasy Grandmasters (2015) – Title Logo Designer
 Final Fantasy: Brave Exvius (2015) – Promotional Artwork, Title Logo Designer
 World of Final Fantasy (2016) – Title Logo Designer
 Final Fantasy XV (2016) – Promotional Artwork, Title Logo Designer & Image Illustrator
 Final Fantasy Dimensions II (2017) – Title Logo Designer
 World of Final Fantasy: Meli-Melo (2017) – Title Logo Designer
 Dissidia Final Fantasy NT (2018) – Title Logo Designer
 Final Fantasy Explorers-Force (2018) – Title Logo Designer
 Arc of Alchemist (2019) – Image Illustrator
 Eternal (2019) – Key Visual, Character Designer, Monster Designer
 War of the Visions: Final Fantasy Brave Exvius (2019) – Title Logo Designer
 Final Fantasy VII Remake (2020) - Title Logo Designer
 Stranger of Paradise: Final Fantasy Origin (2022) – Title Logo Designer
 Final Fantasy XVI (2023)  - Title Logo Designer

Music
 Raphael: Sweet Romance (1999), Yume Yori Suteki na (1999), Hanasaku Inochi Aru Kagiri (1999), Eternal Wish (Todokanu Kimi e) (1999), Promise (1999) – Cover Illustrator
 Galneryus: The Flag of Punishment (2003), Advance to the Fall (2005), Beyond the End of Despair... (2006), Best of the Awakening Days (2009), Best of the Braving Days (2009) – Cover Illustrator
 Vocaloid 3 Library: Zola Project  (2013) – Image Illustrator
 Random Encounter: Lost Frequency (2017) - Cover and Interior Illustrator

Other Works
 Magic: The Gathering Liliana, Dreadhorde General (2019) - Image Illustrator

Notes and references

External links

 Official site
 Yoshitaka Amano Official Fun Community
 Yoshitaka Amano Official Store
 Yoshitaka Amano's Official Blog (Japanese)
 Yoshitaka Amano Museum [Japanese; Archived]
 Deva Zan Official website
 Amano's World – The Art of Yoshitaka Amano [English; Archived]
 Yoshitaka Amano Gallery [English; Archived]
 
 

1952 births
Anime character designers
Final Fantasy designers
Inkpot Award winners
Japanese speculative fiction artists
Fantasy artists
Japanese bloggers
Manga artists from Shizuoka (city)
Japanese painters
Japanese printmakers
Japanese sculptors
Living people
Logo designers
People from Shizuoka (city)
Science fiction artists
Video game artists
Tatsunoko Production people
Writers who illustrated their own writing